London North Centre  is an electoral district in the province of Ontario, Canada, that has been represented in the Legislative Assembly of Ontario since 1999. London North Centre was created from London North to match the federal riding in 1996.

Its population in 2006 was 115,250 and the average family income was $71,995.

Demographics
According to the Canada 2001 Census

Ethnic groups: 86.8% White, 2.0% Chinese, 1.9% Black, 1.8% South Asian, 1.7% Aboriginal, 1.2% Southeast Asian, 1.1% Arab 
Languages: 79.8% English, 1.4% French, 18.0% Other 
Religions: 38.5% Protestant, 27.3% Catholic, 22.6% No religion, 3.0% Muslim, 2.8% Other Christian, 2.2% Christian Orthodox, 1.1% Jewish 
Average income: $31,174

Geography
Elections Ontario's definition of London North Centre consists of that part of the City of London described as 
follows: commencing at the intersection of the northerly 
limit of said city with Highbury Avenue North; thence 
southerly along said avenue to the Canadian National 
Railway situated southerly of Brydges Street; thence 
westerly, southwesterly and southeasterly along said 
railway to the Thames River (South Branch); thence 
generally westerly along said river to the Canadian National 
Railway; thence westerly along said railway to the Thames 
River; thence generally southwesterly along said river to 
Wonderland Road South; thence generally northerly along 
said road and Wonderland Road North to the northerly limit 
of said city; thence northeasterly along said limit to the 
point of commencement.

Members of Provincial Parliament

This riding has elected the following members of the Legislative Assembly of Ontario:

Election results

2007 electoral reform referendum

References

Sources
Elections Ontario Past Election Results

External links
 London North Centre Progressive Conservative Association (Provincial)
 Map of riding for 2018 election

Ontario provincial electoral districts
Politics of London, Ontario